Sepaküla may refer to several places in Estonia:

Sepaküla, Lääne County, village in Ridala Parish, Lääne County
Sepaküla, Pärnu County, village in Halinga Parish, Pärnu County